Betula fruticosa, commonly known as dwarf bog birch, is a species of dwarf birch that grows in central and eastern Europe (except for Finland where it grows rare) and Siberia and Mongolia on elevation of  in forests, streambanks, and swamps.

Description
Female species have an oblong inflorescence which is erect as well. The flowers bloom from June to July and the fruits ripe from July to August.

References

External links

Further reading

fruticosa
Flora of Asia
Flora of Europe
Flora of Mongolia